Little Angels' English Higher Secondary School, locally known as Central syllabus school, is a private School located in Karur, Tamil Nadu, India. The school is the only one in the region following the X-std Indian Certificate of Secondary Education and XII-std Council for the Indian School Certificate Examinations's national curriculum. The institute holds the record of maintaining a 100 percent result for more than two decades. Usha Nandhini is the current principal of the school.

The campus and facilities

The campus is located in a nature reserve on the banks of the Amaravati River.

Student life

The school has a regular system of having elected student representatives, called Ministers. There are ministries whose members are the elected members of the students themselves. In recent years the school has hosted a festival named Grandparent Day when the students bring their grandparents in for a number of games and events. In another festival named Cosmos Carnival, students exhibit their Science and Mathematical models.

The students have annual school trips to locations such as Mysore, Goa for an industrial visit, trekking and also picnics for cultural exchange and delectation.

See also
Indian Certificate of Secondary Education
Council for the Indian School Certificate Examinations
Central Board of Secondary Education
Education in India

External links
 Official website of Department of Secondary and Higher Education, Government of India
Official site of CISCE Board

High schools and secondary schools in Tamil Nadu
Karur
Educational institutions established in 1982
1982 establishments in Tamil Nadu